Love and Love, is the eight studio by Singaporean duo By2. It was released on March 3, 2017 with a total of 13 tracks consisting of three singles and ten remixes. The album's first single "桃花旗袍" received a lot of attention throughout Greater China with many fans performing dance covers and uploading them on YouTube, Instagram, and Weibo.

Background and release 
Prior to the release of the album, the title track, Peach Blossom Cheongsam (桃花旗袍) was released first on January 13, 2017 and the music video for the song was also uploaded on Ocean Butterflies's official YouTube channel. Following the release of the album, the music video of their second promotional single, Love and Love (愛又愛), was released on March 3, 2017. At last, the third album MV Mr. Dream (夢先生) was released on April 13, 2017.

Commercial performance 
The album single Peach Blossom Cheongsam (桃花旗袍) peaked at number 5 on Billboard's China's V Chart during the week of March 4, 2017. The title track Love and Love (愛又愛) also peaked at number 5 during the week of March 18, 2017. By2 held a fan meeting in Taipei, Taiwan on the day of the album release in Ximending. By2 did appear on Taiwanese variety shows to perform the album during the first weeks of March 2017. The rest of their live performances and fan meetings have only been in Mainland China.

Composition 
The studio album contains 13 tracks, including the title track, Peach Blossom Cheongsom (桃花旗袍). The track has influences from Traditional Chinese culture but, also has modern influences to be a dance a track. Love and Love's 10 non-single tracks are all remixes of previous By2 songs.

Track listing 



References

By2 albums
2017 albums